Phillimore is the surname of various people. It may also refer to:

 Baron Phillimore or the Phillimore Baronets, a title in the Peerage of the United Kingdom
 Phillimore Island, an island in the River Thames in southern England
 Phillimore & Co. Ltd., former publishing house of Shopwyke Hall, Chichester, founded by William Phillimore Watts Phillimore

See also
 Fillmore (disambiguation)